Lānai High and Elementary School (LHES) is located on the island of Lanai in the U.S. state of Hawaii. It is the largest of six K-12 public schools in the Hawaii State Department of Education system. Lanai High and Elementary School is the only school on the island located in the heart of Lanai City, which is also the only urban settlement on the island. As of 2007, there are 672 students with a ratio of 1 teacher per 15 students.

Art
The campus boasts the wood sculpture Lanai Ohana by Ken Shutt, the ceramic sculpture The Pool Committee by Kay Mura-Davidson, and the mixed media sculpture Torch to Lana'i's Youth by Bruce Paul Fink.

Student Activities 
Student activities is generally administered by the Associated Students of Lanai High. Activities include: a Fall Spirit Week in October, Homecoming in January, and a Promenade ran by the Senior Class of that year. Student Council consists of 5 representatives from each class: a President, Vice President, Secretary, Treasurer, and Sgt at Arms. The Student Council also consists of a governing executive body including a President, Vice President, Corresponding Secretary, Recording Secretary, Treasurer, two School Community Council Representatives, a Maui District Council Representative, and a Hawaii State Council Representative. 

List of Student Council Presidents:
 Anela Fernandez (15-16)
 Leonard Valdez (16-17)
 Jesse James Raqueno (17-18)
 Sophia Choi Lim (18-19)
 Mika Badillo (19-20)
 Kainalu Morimoto (20-21)
 Talia Agliam  (Miss Teen Lanai) (21-22)
 Keala Montgomery* (22-23)

Incumbent

Athletics 
LHS offers a variety of sports for students to participate in. Some of the sports offered are Boys' Basketball Jr's and Sr teams, Girls' Basketball, Cheer-leading, Canoe Paddling, Co-ed Cross Country, Co-ed Tennis, Golf, Wrestling, Baseball, Girls' Volleyball, Boys' Volleyball, and Girls' Softball, Jr and HS Teams.

[Only Sports offered for Elementary and Intermediate levels are Intramural County-funded Co-ed Basketball and Biddy Baseball and T-Ball; Teams are formed based on parent partnering for coaching availability.]

See also
List of high schools in Hawaii

External links 
Lanai High School Alumni
Lanai High and Elementary School
Lanai K-12
Hawaii Department of Education profile
Talia Agliam First Teen Lanai

Lanai
Public schools in Maui County, Hawaii
Public high schools in Maui County, Hawaii
Public K-12 schools in Hawaii
Educational institutions established in 1938
1938 establishments in Hawaii